Joyful Noise or A Joyful Noise may refer to:

Named works
A Joyful Noise, a 1966 musical with a book by Edward Padula and music and lyrics by Oscar Brand and Paul Nassau
Joyful Noise: Poems for Two Voices, a 1989 children's book by Paul Fleischman
Joyful Noise Recordings, an independent record label founded in Indiana in 2003
Joyful Noise (album), a 2002 album by The Derek Trucks Band
A Joyful Noise (Jo Dee Messina album), a 2002 Christmas album by Jo Dee Messina
Joyful Noise (film), a music-driven 2012 film by Todd Graff, starring Queen Latifah and Dolly Parton
A Joyful Noise (Gossip album), a 2012 album by the dance-punk band Gossip
 A Joyful Noise (Drinkard Singers album), 1958
"Joyful Noise", a 2008 song by Flame (rapper)
see Robert Tilton, Joyful Noise is one of the many names listed for the satire flatulence parody videos involving his prosperity gospel sermons
Joyful Noise (chorus), a singing ensemble for people with disabilities, founded in 2000